TJ Družstevník Topoľníky is a Slovak football team, based in the town of Topoľníky.

External links 
at dsportal.sk

References

Football clubs in Slovakia